Aleksandr Dmitriyevich Yelovskikh (born 12 September 1998) is a Russian football player.

Club career
He made his debut in the Russian Football National League for FC Zenit-2 Saint Petersburg on 16 July 2017 in a game against FC Dynamo Saint Petersburg.

References

External links
 Profile by Russian Football National League

1998 births
Footballers from Saint Petersburg
Living people
Russian footballers
Russia youth international footballers
Association football midfielders
Association football forwards
FC Zenit-2 Saint Petersburg players